Gustave Prouvost (born 25 March 1887, date of death unknown) was a French water polo player. He was a member of the France men's national water polo team. He competed with the team at the 1912 Summer Olympics.

References

External links
 

1887 births
Year of death missing
French male water polo players
Water polo players at the 1912 Summer Olympics
Olympic water polo players of France
Sportspeople from Tourcoing